The Consulate-General of the Republic of Equatorial Guinea in Houston is Equatorial Guinea's diplomatic facility in Houston, Texas, United States.

The President of Equatorial Guinea, Teodoro Obiang, inaugurated the consulate in 2009. The consulate opened because of the oil industry ties between Houston and Equatorial Guinea, the third largest producer of crude oil in Sub-Saharan Africa. In addition the population of Equatorial Guinean citizens, under 100, is the largest Equatorial Guinean population in the United States.

See also

 Diplomatic missions of Equatorial Guinea

References

External links
 Consulate-General of Equatorial Guinea in Houston 

Houston
Equatorial Guinea
Equatorial Guinea–United States relations